Jovan Jacques Bowles (born 27 June 1983 in Durban, South Africa) is a South African rugby union footballer who is currently playing for the Border Bulldogs. He plays the position of centre.

Bowles attended St Henry's Marist Brothers' College where he was head boy in 2000 and played in the first rugby team from 1998 to 2000. He was captain of the South African Emerging Sevens team when they won the Tusker Sevens tournament in Kenya in 2006 and 2007. He is the brother of Maso Bowles who played for the Springbok under 21 side in the 2000 u/21 SANZAR series in which John Smit captained the side to victory in the series.

Bowles made his debut for the Springbok Sevens in 2006 at Dubai where the Springbok Sevens team went on to win that leg of the IRB Sevens World Series.

References

External links
 
 Sharks Sevens Captain profile

1983 births
Living people
Male rugby sevens players
Rugby union centres
Rugby union players from Durban
South Africa international rugby sevens players
South African rugby union players
Falcons (rugby union) players